Håkan Pettersson may refer to:

 Håkan Pettersson (ice hockey) (1949–2008), Swedish professional ice hockey player
 Håkan Pettersson (Swedish Air Force officer) (born 1947), Swedish Air Force major general
 Håkan Pettersson (orienteer), Swedish orienteering competitor